Dr. Janamaddi Hanumath Sastri (1926–2014) was an Indian writer and linguist from Kadapa, Andhra Pradesh. He wrote several books in Telugu and English. He served the Kadapa writers’ organisation for four decades and established C. P. Brown Memorial Library there. Jnanpith Award winner C. Narayana Reddy used to fondly call him Brown Sastri for his extensive research on Brown.

He was born in Rayadurgam, Anantapur district in 1926 to the couple Subbanna, Janakamma. He worked as a teacher in 1946 at Government Secondary Grade School, Bellary.

Writings
He wrote over 2,500 articles in various newspapers and publications and authored 16 books. Notable works include life histories of C P Brown, Mokshagundam Vishweshvaraiah, Bellary Raghava.

Awards
 Ayyanki Vekataramanaiah Award
 Anantapur Lalita Kala Parishat Award
 Dharmavaram Kalajyoti Sirisi Anjaneyulu Award
 Kadapa Savera Arts Sahiti Prapurna Award
 Madanapalli Bharatamuni Kalaratna Award
 Telugu University Pratibha Puraskaram
 Bangalore Akhila Bharata Grandhalaya Mahasabha Puraskaram
 Lok Nayak Foundation Literary Award

References

1926 births
2014 deaths
People from Anantapur district
Telugu writers
Writers from Andhra Pradesh
People from Kadapa district